Debshishu is a 1985 Indian Hindi-language film directed by Utpalendu Chakrabarty, starring Smita Patil and Om Puri. The film is an NFDC production, and Patil worked without remuneration.

Cast

Smita Patil
Om Puri
Rohini Hattangadi
Sadhu Meher

References

External links
 

1985 films
1980s Hindi-language films